is a Japanese racing driver.

Racing Kart / Formula race

Tomonobu Fujii entered the second-hand Racing Kart in 1994 and made his debut in local races when he was 13 years old. He won the championship right away and continued to display his talent in local races. He continued to achieve many victories won the Series Championships twice. He stepped up to Formula races soon after, that but was forced to suspend his participation in the races due to lack of funds. Fujii went to seek sponsors in this one year of interval. He then participated in Formula 4 in 2002 where he won two victories in a year and obtained Second Series as well as MVP. Fujii received a scholarship and participated in Formula Dream by HONDA for two years from 2003. He accumulated more experience, eventually winning the 4th Series Championship in 2004.

Super GT
Fujii made his debut in Super GT, which is the top category in Japan, in 2005. Once he started to race with a Nissan 350Z, he reached the podium four times and won the 4th position in 2006. He won his first championship in the opening race of Super GT in 2007 and competed for the Series Championship. He then received a contract with NISMO as a factory driver in 2008, although he continued to race with a Nissan 350Z in Super GT till 2008. He obtained 5th place in 2007 and 2008. From 2010 to 2013, he contracted with Hankook Tire as a factory driver and raced with a Porsche GT3R (RSR) during that 4 years. He reached 3rd Series in 2011 and 2nd Series in 2012. He has been racing with an Audi R8 LMS Ultra since 2014.

Super GT / JAF Grand Prix Fuji Sprint Cup
Fujii obtained 3rd place with a Porsche GT3R in 2010, 2nd place in 2011, and he won the championship in 2012 in the JAF Grand Prix Fuji Sprint Cup held at Fuji Speedway.

Endurance race
Fujii has been participating in the Super Taikyu race along with the Super GT in Japan for many years. He raced with Nissan a 350Z from 2006 to 2009 and won the Series Championship in 2007. He won the victory as a development driver of a Nissan 370Z NISMO RC in 2010. He won three victories with an Audi R8 LMS in 2011 and won the Series Championship for the GT3 Class. He raced with a Nissan GT-R NISMO GT3 from 2012 to 2014. Fujii also joined the All Japan Endurance Championship held in Japan in both 2006 and 2007. He won the Series Championship in the LMP2 class in 2006 and in the LMGT1 class with a Ferrari 550 GT1 in 2007.

Fujii also has experience in overseas races, mainly participating in craft racing in Hong Kong with an Aston Martin Vantage GT3. He has participated in the Asian Lemans, Merdeka Millennium Endurance Race, and the Dubai 24Hrs race. He achieved 3rd place in Dubai 24Hrs in 2013. He has also placed 53rd in the Rolex 24 AT Daytona 2015, driving with Flying Lizard Motorsports.

Racing Record

Super GT results
(key) (Races in bold indicate pole position) (Races in italics indicate fastest lap)

24 Hours of Dubai results
(key) (Races in bold indicate pole position) (Races in italics indicate fastest lap)

24 Hours of Daytona results
(key) (Races in bold indicate pole position) (Races in italics indicate fastest lap)

Complete 24 Hours of Le Mans results

Complete FIA World Endurance Championship results
(key) (Races in bold indicate pole position) (Races in italics indicate fastest lap)

* Season still in progress.

References

Living people
Japanese racing drivers
1980 births
Sportspeople from Tokyo
Super GT drivers
24 Hours of Daytona drivers
24H Series drivers
Asian Le Mans Series drivers
WeatherTech SportsCar Championship drivers
24 Hours of Le Mans drivers
FIA World Endurance Championship drivers
Kondō Racing drivers
Porsche Motorsports drivers
Nismo drivers
Nürburgring 24 Hours drivers